Birgha Archale  is a village development committee in Syangja District in the Gandaki Zone of central Nepal. At the time of the 2011 Nepal census it had a population of 5117 people living in 1180 individual households around the city.
This village is situated in the west end district of Syangja. Two members of parliament have been elected in the constituency no 3 are Shanker Pandey and Mohan Pandey

References

External links
UN map of the municipalities of Syangja District

Populated places in Syangja District